Thomy is a Swiss food brand owned by Nestlé. It produces condiments such as mayonnaise, mustard, salad dressings, tomato puree and cooking oil.

Background

In 1907, Helvetia became the first company to produce mustard on an industrial scale in Switzerland. Its mustard was sold in bulk in large stoneware pots under the Langenthaler Senf brand. Subsequently renamed Thomi’s Langenthaler Senf, the brand was eventually registered under the name Thomy’s Senf in 1930, with the ‘i’ being replaced with a ‘y’ in Thomy to make it a more internationally marketable name.

Hans Thomi, the founder of Thomi & Franck SA also decided to sell his mustard in a tube to set it apart from that of his competitors. In 1951 Thomy began mayonnaise production as well, while in 1976 they expanded to introduce bottled salad dressings. Thomy was acquired by Nestlé in 1971.

The Thomy man character, or “Thomymännli”, was the product of a competition held in 1931 in which the company asked its consumers for submissions. The competition received 20,000 responses, and the name Senf-Thomy was chosen along with the famous tube shaped character. The character has been the main icon for Thomy since the early 1990s.

Thomy is currently only produced in Switzerland, Serbia and Germany, where production begun in 1956, although it is exported throughout Europe.

Thomy currently runs operating  plants in Karlsruhe and Neuss in Germany, and in Basel, Switzerland.

Popularity in Switzerland

Thomy has been voted among the twenty most popular Swiss brands for the last ten years, demonstrating its popularity in Switzerland. It also enjoys a 99% recognition rate in Swiss households, and is consumed in over 2.3 million households.

An average Swiss household consumes about five Thomy mayonnaise tubes a year as well as three Thomy mustard tubes. The per capita consumption of mayonnaise and mustard in Switzerland is 1 kg and 500g respectively.

Products
In 2008 Thomy launched a new Tartare Light mayonnaise, containing 50% less fat and mayonnaise made from rapeseed oil.

Thomy has recently partnered with Coop Naturaplan and now produces certified organic mustard, mayonnaise, and salad dressings.

See also
 List of mustard brands

References

Food and drink companies of Switzerland
1907 establishments in Switzerland
Nestlé brands